Reinhold Zagorny (born 30 September 1956) is a retired German football midfielder.

References

External links
 

1956 births
Living people
German footballers
Bundesliga players
VfL Bochum players
VfL Bochum II players
SpVgg Erkenschwick players
Association football midfielders